Navy General Staff may refer to:

 The Hellenic Navy General Staff, the general staff of the Hellenic Navy, the naval component of the Greek Armed Forces, active from 1907 to 1941 and since 1944
 The Imperial Japanese Navy General Staff, the highest organ within the Imperial Japanese Navy, in charge of planning and operations, active from 1893 to 1945